Kirkinner was a railway station on the Wigtownshire Railway branch line, from Newton Stewart to Whithorn, of the Portpatrick and Wigtownshire Joint Railway. It served a rural area in Wigtownshire. Kirkinner is an area and village, 3 miles from Wigtown, bounded on the east by the bay of Wigtown, along which it extends for about three miles, and on the north by the River Bladnoch.

History
 
The Portpatrick and Wigtownshire Joint Railway was formed from the amalgamation of two railway companies: The Portpatrick Railway and the Wigtownshire Railway, which got into financial difficulties; they merged and were taken over.

A station master's house was provided. In 1908 the station is shown as having a passing loop, a single platform, two sidings, a weighing machine, a ticket office and waiting room, all sitting within a cutting.

Other stations 
 Newton Stewart - junction
 Causewayend
 Wigtown
 Whauphill
 Sorbie
 Millisle
 Garlieston
 Broughton Skeog
 Whithorn

See also
 List of closed railway stations in Britain

References 
Notes

Sources
 
 Casserley, H.C.(1968). Britain's Joint Lines. Shepperton: Ian Allan. .

External links
 Disused stations
 RailScot

Disused railway stations in Dumfries and Galloway
Former Portpatrick and Wigtownshire Joint Railway stations
Railway stations in Great Britain opened in 1875
Railway stations in Great Britain closed in 1950